Pablo Alfaro Armengot (born 26 April 1969) is a Spanish retired footballer who played as a central defender, currently manager of San Fernando CD.

In his career, in which he represented six teams – most notably Sevilla – he amassed La Liga totals of 418 matches and seven goals over 15 seasons, receiving a total of 18 red cards and being sent off nearly 30 times.

Alfaro embarked on a managerial career in the late 2000s.

Playing career
Born in Zaragoza, Alfaro started his career with his hometown club Real Zaragoza. He made his La Liga debut on 3 September 1989 in a 3–0 home win against Rayo Vallecano, and he only missed one league game in his debut season as they finished in ninth position.

In the summer of 1992, Alfaro signed with FC Barcelona, being rarely used in his only season in Catalonia. He went on to represent Racing de Santander and Atlético Madrid, being an undisputed starter with the former but only second or third choice with the latter.

Alfaro joined CP Mérida for the 1997–98 campaign, playing all but four matches as the Extremadurans were relegated from the top flight and collecting 12 yellow cards and two red in the process. In 1999–2000, the side finished sixth in the Segunda División but was relegated again, due to financial irregularities.

In the 2000 off-season, the veteran moved to Sevilla FC also in division two, helping the Andalusia team to return to the top division in his first season. During his spell, Alfaro formed a fearsome partnership with Javi Navarro, but following the emergence of youth graduate Sergio Ramos and the January 2006 arrival of Julien Escudé, he became a secondary defensive unit, leaving in that transfer window to former side Racing and scoring a rare but crucial goal on 7 May in a 2–1 home win against CA Osasuna to help them to barely avoid top-tier relegation.

Coaching career
Alfaro retired from football at the end of the 2006–07 season aged nearly 38, having appeared in exactly 600 official games as a professional. Two years later he started his coaching career, with Segunda División B team Pontevedra CF, leading the Galicians to the fourth position in the regular season, albeit with no subsequent play-off promotion. 

Alfaro upgraded a division on 17 June 2010, signing with Recreativo de Huelva. Exactly four months later, after only four draws in eight matches, he was fired by the oldest club in Spain.

In June 2012, Alfaro joined third-tier CD Leganés for the upcoming campaign. He took the Community of Madrid team to the play-offs, where they lost 3–2 on aggregate to Lleida Esportiu in the quarter-finals.

Alfaro returned to his native Aragon in June 2013, taking over an SD Huesca side that had just descended from the second division. Having won and drawn one each of his first five matches, he was sacked on 25 September. 

On 2 December 2014, Alfaro replaced Jaime Molina as manager of Marbella FC on a deal for the end of the season. The following 23 March, as they fell into the relegation places with a fourth consecutive defeat, he was shown the door.

Alfaro returned to the second level on 28 March 2017, being appointed at last-placed CD Mirandés until June following the dismissal of Javier Álvarez de los Mozos. He remained in Miranda de Ebro after their relegation, and won their group the following season. After being eliminated 2–1 on aggregate from the play-off semi-finals by Extremadura UD, he was not offered a new deal in June 2018.

On 28 February 2019, UD Ibiza chose Alfaro as their replacement for Andrés Palop until the end of 2019–20. On 2 December of the following year, he took over fellow third-division side Córdoba CF.

On 23 December 2022, Alfaro replaced Salva Ballesta at San Fernando CD, becoming their third manager of the season.

Personal life
Alfaro majored in medicine, although he never practised.

Managerial statistics

Honours
Barcelona
La Liga: 1992–93
UEFA Super Cup: 1992

Sevilla
UEFA Cup: 2005–06

See also
List of La Liga players (400+ appearances)

References

External links

1969 births
Living people
Spanish footballers
Footballers from Zaragoza
Association football defenders
La Liga players
Segunda División players
Segunda División B players
Real Zaragoza B players
Real Zaragoza players
FC Barcelona players
Racing de Santander players
Atlético Madrid footballers
CP Mérida footballers
Sevilla FC players
UEFA Cup winning players
Spanish football managers
Segunda División managers
Segunda División B managers
Primera Federación managers
Pontevedra CF managers
Recreativo de Huelva managers
CD Leganés managers
SD Huesca managers
CD Mirandés managers
UD Ibiza managers
Córdoba CF managers